Boris Lushniak is a retired United States Public Health Service Commissioned Corps rear admiral who served as the acting Surgeon General of the United States, from July 17, 2013 to December 18, 2014. He previously served as the Deputy Surgeon General from 2010 to 2013 and from 2014 to 2015 when Vivek Murthy assumed office as Surgeon General. He retired from the Public Health Service on December 8, 2015 after over 27 years of service. On October 4, 2016 he was appointed dean of the University of Maryland, College Park School of Public Health, effective January 9, 2017.

Early life and education
A native of Chicago, Illinois, Lushniak is of Ukrainian ancestry, went to St. Ignatius College Prep and is a graduate of the Feinberg School of Medicine at Northwestern University and Harvard School of Public Health. He completed a residency in family medicine in 1987 at St Joseph Hospital in Chicago and a residency in dermatology at the University of Cincinnati in 1993.

Career
Starting out in the Epidemic Intelligence Service in 1988, Lushniak spent the next 16 years with the Centers for Disease Control and Prevention, working on assignments in Russia, Kosovo and Bangladesh. He also worked at the World Trade Center site and with the CDC anthrax team. Lushniak joined the Food and Drug Administration in 2004. He served as the Chief Medical Officer, Office of Counter-terrorism Policy and Planning in the Office of the Commissioner before being named FDA Assistant Commissioner, Counterterrorism Policy and Director of the Office of Counterterrorism and Emerging Threats within the Office of the Commissioner, the following year. In 2010 he was promoted to rear admiral (upper half) and named Deputy Surgeon General. Between July 2013 and December 2014 he served as Acting Surgeon General until the appointment of Vivek Murthy was approved December 15, 2014.

Retiring from the USPHS in September 2015, Lushniak joined the faculty of the Uniformed Services University of Health Sciences. Lushniak served as the chairman of the Preventive Medicine and Biostatistics department.

Role in Ebola virus cases in the United States
During the ebola crisis in the US the vacancy of the position of Surgeon General was a topic of note. Lushniak "has not been confirmed, and lacks the authority to actively pursue a public health agenda for the nation" per New England Journal of Medicine Editors-in-Chief and executive editor in October 2014, who stated also: "We have heard little from him during the Ebola outbreak". The Washington Post wrote, that he has kept a low profile during the Ebola crisis, deferring to CDC Director Tom Frieden to speak publicly to educate and reassure the people. Yet CBS News quoted Lawrence Gostin, director of the O'Neill Institute for National and Global Health Law at Georgetown University, and Michael Leavitt saying that a surgeon general would probably not be an effective leader in the fight against Ebola.

Awards and decorations
Lushniak is the recipient of the following awards and decorations:
Uniformed services awards and decorations

Personal life
Lushniak is married with two daughters, is active in the Ukrainian-American community and is member of Plast, serving at camps for Ukrainian scouts in Wisconsin and New York.

References

Year of birth missing (living people)
Living people
American people of Ukrainian descent
Harvard School of Public Health alumni
Feinberg School of Medicine alumni
People from Chicago
Surgeons General of the United States
United States Public Health Service Commissioned Corps admirals
University of Maryland, College Park administrators
St. Ignatius College Prep alumni
Recipients of the Public Health Service Distinguished Service Medal